The Propsteikirche (German for "provost church"), also known as the Katholische Kirche (Catholic church), was a Roman Catholic church in the Sackheim quarter of Königsberg, Germany. Its patron saint was John the Baptist.

History

As part of his investiture as Duke of Prussia in Warsaw in 1611, Elector John Sigismund agreed to the building of a church for Catholics in mostly Protestant Königsberg. The church was built in Sackheim from 1614 to 1616, but burned down during the great fire of 11 November 1764. It was rebuilt from 1765 to 1776 under the direction of Johann Samuel Lilienthal, who also constructed the chaplain's Kaplanei northwest of the church from 1770 to 1772. The rebuilt Baroque church was dedicated in 1777.

In 1810 Max von Schenkendorf led an obsequy for the popular Queen Louise at the Propsteikirche with music by Johann Friedrich Reichardt. The church was taken over by the Old Catholics in 1876. In 1868 Julius Dinder was appointed provost of Königsberg in Prussia, and by 1889 the church had been reverted to the Holy See. In 1886 Dinder became Archbishop of Gniezno (Gnesen-Posen).

The church was heavily damaged by the 1944 Bombing of Königsberg and the 1945 Battle of Königsberg. The Soviet administration in Kaliningrad demolished the remnants in the 1960s.

Gallery

References

17th-century Roman Catholic church buildings in Germany
1944 disestablishments in Germany
Baroque architecture in Germany
Buildings and structures in Germany destroyed during World War II
Destroyed churches in Germany
Former churches in Königsberg
Old Catholicism in Germany
Religious buildings and structures completed in 1616
Religious organizations established in 1616
1616 establishments in Europe

pl:Sackheim (Królewiec)#Kościół św. Jana Chrzciciela (Propsteikirche)